BAAS may refer to:
 Bachelor of Applied Arts and Sciences, a bachelor's degree offered at some universities
 British Association for the Advancement of Science, now the British Science Association
 British Association for American Studies
 Bulletin of the American Astronomical Society

See also 
 Baas, a surname